The Candelaria mine is a large open pit and underground copper-gold mine located in northern Chile in the Atacama Region. Candelaria has Proven and Probable Reserves of 676 million tonnes of ore grading 0.53% copper, 0.13 g/t gold, and 1.79 g/t silver; containing 3.58 million tonnes of copper, 3.0 million oz of gold and 39 million oz of silver.
The mine project incorporates a reverse osmosis plant at the port of Caldera, commissioned in 2013, with a capacity to produce 500 litres per second of desalinated industrial water, piping it 115 km from the Pacific Ocean to the minesite.

The project was operated since discovery by Phelps Dodge, which was taken over by Freeport-McMoRan in 2007. Lundin Mining bought out Freeport's 80% stake in 2014.

References 

Copper mines in Chile
Gold mines in Chile
Silver mines in Chile
Mines in Atacama Region